A boarding house is a house, frequently a family home, in which lodgers, license and do not exclusively possess, one or more rooms, for one or more nights.

boarding house may also refer to:

Buildings 
 Anderson Boarding House, an historic building in Clarendon, Arkansas.
 Bass Boarding House, an historic building in Wilton, Maine.
 Bogan Boarding House, an historic building in Park City, Utah.
 Castleberry Boarding House, an historic building in Port Vincent
 Espey Boarding House (DeCicco Building), an historic building in Portland, Oregon.
 Fries Boarding Houses, two historic boarding houses in Fries, Grayson County, Virginia.
 Galo Arambarri Boarding House, an historic building near Shoshone, Idaho.
 Hester E. Suydam Boarding House, an historic building in Fromberg, Montana.
 King's Boarding House, an historic building in Maidenwell, Australia.
 Luke Bone Grocery-Boarding House, an historic building in Bald Knob, Arkansas.
 Mary E. Surratt Boarding House, an historic site of meetings of conspirators to assassinate Abraham Lincoln.
 Moye Boarding House, an historic building in Portland, Tennessee.
 Nortonia Boarding House, an historic building in Reno, Nevada.
 Smith-Williams-Durham Boarding House, an historic building in Hendersonville, North Carolina. 
 W C A Boarding House, an historic building in Springfield, Massachusetts
 Yount's Woolen Mill and Boarding House, an historic building in Ripley Township, Indiana. 
 Zappe Boarding House, an historic building in Ferriday, Louisiana.

Film
 Boarding House Groonen (German: Pension Groonen), a 1925 Austrian silent comedy film directed by Robert Wiene.
 College Boarding House (Spanish: La casa de la Troya), a 1959 Spanish comedy film directed by Rafael Gil.
 Fultah Fisher's Boarding House, a 1922 American silent film short and the first film directed by Frank Capra.
 Boarding House Blues, a 1948 American race film directed by Josh Binney.
 Boardinghouse (film) (Boarding House, Housegeist), a 1982 American film directed, written by, and starring John Wintergate.
 The House That Screamed (1969 film) (The Boarding School),  a 1969 Spanish horror film, written and directed by Narciso Ibáñez Serrador.

Music
 Major Hoople's Boarding House, a Canadian pop band from Cambridge, Ontario.
 Boarding House Reach, the third studio album by American rock musician Jack White, released in 2018.
 Live at the Boarding House, an album recorded by the 1973–1974 bluegrass group, Old & In the Way.
 Live at the Boarding House: The Complete Shows, a four-CD live album by the bluegrass band Old & In the Way. 
 "Silver Threads Among the Gold", a song was parodied as "In the Boarding House"
 1978 Boarding House Tour, a tour by Neil Young

Retail
 ZJ Boarding House, a surfboard, skateboard, snowboard, and clothing store in Santa Monica, California.

Venues
 The Boarding House (nightclub), a music and comedy nightclub in San Francisco, California, opened by David Allen in 1971.

Writings
 Our Boarding House, an American single-panel cartoon and comic strip, created by Gene Ahern, on October 3, 1921.
 The Boarding House, a short story by James Joyce, published in his 1914 collection, Dubliners.
 The Boarding House Proprietor and His Guest, a work by Clarence Gabriel Moran#Books and articles